Theta Kappa Phi was a social fraternity founded on , at Lehigh University in Pennsylvania. On , Theta Kappa Phi merged with a similar Catholic fraternity, Phi Kappa, to form Phi Kappa Theta.

History
The idea for the organization developed from a group of men who were a part of the university’s Newman Club, who had met in 1914.  Plans for the official establishment of the fraternity fell through upon the entry of the United States into the First World War in 1917, with several members subsequently joining the armed forces. Of the original group, three returned to Lehigh at the end of hostilities to resume their studies. These became the Founders: 
 August Concilio
 Peter J. Carr
 Raymond J. Bobbin 

Following the conclusion of the war in November 1918 and the return of members back to school, Carr led efforts to restart the process of establishing a social fraternity at Lehigh. Ultimately thirty men, including Concilio, Carr, and Bobbin, agreed to the establishment of the X Club, the original name of Theta Kappa Phi.

During the first few months of the new fraternity’s existence, several important actions were undertaken. In a meeting on November 12, 1919, the X Club would select Theta Kappa Phi as its new name. At the time of its adoption, the letters simply stood in place for ‘The Catholic Fraternity’ before they were given a secret meaning later upon merger into Phi Kappa Theta in 1959. The founding group would elect Concilio as the fraternity’s first President.

Meanwhile, the fraternity would receive valuable help and inspiring leadership from local Bethlehem pastor, Rev. William I. McGarvey. Since none of the existing members had fraternity experience, McGarvey was a valuable asset in developing the fledgling group into a true fraternity in its early days. McGarvey would additionally secure the help of Rev. Michael Andrew Chapman in writing Theta Kappa Phi’s ritual, who was an Episcopal priest as well as a member of Sigma Alpha Epsilon at Bard College. The basics of Theta Kappa Phi’s ritual are still used in Phi Kappa Theta’s ritual today, while McGarvey’s effort for Theta Kappa Phi have seen him recognized as the fraternity’s fourth founder, alongside Concilio, Carr, and Bobbin.

Theta Kappa Phi would continue to expand to other colleges and universities in the surrounding region. By the time the merger came about in 1959, Theta Kappa Phi maintained 24 open and active chapters across the United States.

Symbols
Publication - The Sun of Theta Kappa Phi
All this was mounted on a gold shield bordered with crown-set pearls, and four rubies in the form of a cross. 
Pledge button - Shield of white, bordered with a gold chain enclosing a golden sun.
Colors - Red, Silver and gold
Flower - Columbine

Chapters
Chapters of Theta Kappa Phi were as follows.  Chapters and colonies in bold were active at the time of the merger, those in italics were inactive:

References

See also
 Phi Kappa (Catholic fraternity)
 Phi Kappa Theta

Defunct former members of the North American Interfraternity Conference
Student organizations established in 1919
1919 establishments in Pennsylvania